Cloven Hoof may refer to:

 Cloven Hoof (band), a heavy metal band from Wolverhampton
 Cloven Hoof (album), a 1984 album by Cloven Hoof
 Cloven hoof, a hoof split into two toes
 Cloven paw, a genetic abnormality in the paws of dogs and cats.